The Battle of Ani was fought between the forces of the Kingdom of Armenia under Vahram Pahlavouni and the Byzantine Empire in 1042. The Byzantine Empire was soundly defeated, with up to 20,000 dead.

Background
Vahram selected a body of 30,000 infantry and 20,000 cavalry, forming three divisions, which fought against the Byzantines, numbering 100,000. A battle ensued in which the invaders were routed with great slaughter. The fight was so ferocious that the effusion of blood flowing into the Akhurian River is said to have coloured its waters completely red.

The Byzantines were defeated. This victory allowed Vahram Pahlavuni along with Catholicos Petros Getadarts to crown Gagik II king of Armenia and subsequently take the fortress of Ani, which had been in the hands of Vest Sarkis.

See also
 Vahram Pahlavouni
 Byzantine Empire
 Byzantine Armenia

References

Sources

 
 F. Macler. Armenia, The Kingdom of the Bagratides. The Cambridge Ancient History, Vol. IV.
 Tupper, H. Allen. Armenia: its present crisis and past history.

Ani
Ani
1040s in the Byzantine Empire
History of Kars Province
Battles in medieval Anatolia
Ani
1042 in Asia